

Champions

Major League Baseball
World Series: New York Yankees over Los Angeles Dodgers (4–2); Bucky Dent, MVP

American League Championship Series MVP: None
National League Championship Series MVP: Steve Garvey
All-Star Game, July 11 at San Diego Stadium: National League, 7–3; Steve Garvey, MVP

Other champions
Amateur World Series: Cuba
College World Series: USC
Japan Series: Yakult Swallows over Hankyu Braves (4–3)
Big League World Series: Taipei, Taiwan
Little League World Series: Pin-Kuang, Pin-Tung, Taiwan
Senior League World Series: Hualien, Taiwan
Winter Leagues
1978 Caribbean Series: Indios de Mayagüez
Dominican Republic League: Águilas Cibaeñas
Mexican Pacific League: Tomateros de Culiacán
Puerto Rican League: Indios de Mayagüez
Venezuelan League: Leones del Caracas

Awards and honors
Baseball Hall of Fame
Addie Joss
Larry MacPhail
Eddie Mathews
Most Valuable Player
Jim Rice (AL) Boston Red Sox
Dave Parker (NL) Pittsburgh Pirates
Cy Young Award
Ron Guidry (AL) New York Yankees
Gaylord Perry (NL) San Diego Padres
Rookie of the Year
Lou Whitaker (AL) Detroit Tigers
Bob Horner (NL) Atlanta Braves
Woman Executive of the Year (major or minor league): Patty Cox, Oklahoma City 89ers, American Association
Gold Glove Award
Chris Chambliss (1B) (AL) 
Frank White (2B) (AL) 
Graig Nettles (3B) (AL) 
Mark Belanger (SS)  (AL) 
Dwight Evans (OF) (AL) 
Fred Lynn (OF)  (AL) 
Rick Miller (OF) (AL)
Jim Sundberg (C) (AL) 
Jim Palmer (P) (AL)

MLB statistical leaders

Major league baseball final standings

Events

January–March
January 19 – Eddie Mathews is elected to the Hall of Fame by the Baseball Writers' Association of America on 301 of 379 ballots.
January 25 – The San Diego Padres send Dave Tomlin and cash to the Texas Rangers in return for Gaylord Perry, who will win this year's National League Cy Young Award.
January 31 - Commissioner Bowie Kuhn voids the Oakland Athletics' trade of Vida Blue to the Cincinnati Reds, citing the "best interests of baseball" clause.  As compensation, the A's send Doug Bair to the Reds for minor-league prospect Dave Revering.
March 17 – At Al Lopez Field in Tampa, Florida, the Cincinnati Reds host the New York Yankees in a Spring training match-up wearing green uniforms in honor of St. Patrick's Day. In , the Boston Red Sox become the second team to adopt this tradition.

April
April 1 – Starting off with a bang, Japanese star Sadaharu Oh hits a grand slam home run on opening day. It is his 757th home run.
April 9 - Comeback hopeful Steve Busby, making his first major-league start since July 6, 1976, hurled 5 and one third innings before being relieved and Darrell Porter drove in a couple of runs as the Kansas City Royals beat the Cleveland Indians 5-4.
April 13 – The New York Yankees defeat the Chicago White Sox 4–2 in their home opener on Reggie Candy Bar Day. Reggie Jackson slugs a 3-run home run in the first inning, and the field is showered with candy bars which were given out free to the fans at the game.
April 16 – The St. Louis Cardinals' Bob Forsch hurls a no-hitter in beating the Philadelphia Phillies 5–0. His brother, the Houston Astros' Ken Forsch, will toss a no-hitter the following season against the Atlanta Braves – making them the first big league brothers to each toss a no-hitter.
April 20 – With two out in the top of the fourth inning, the Atlanta Braves' Jeff Burroughs hits a ground ball up the middle that San Diego Padres rookie shortstop Ozzie Smith dives for behind second base. As he was in the air, the ball hits the base and caroms behind Smith. As he is diving in the opposite direction, Smith reaches out with his bare hand and catches the ball. He bounces up, and throws Burroughs out at first. The Padres win the game 2–0.
April 27 - Willie McCovey drove in four runs and a double and his 496th home run in leading Vida Blue and the San Francisco Giants to a 5-3 win over the Atlanta Braves.
April 29 – Pete Rose smashes three home runs in a 14–7 win over the New York Mets.

May
May 5 – Pete Rose singles off Montreal's Steve Rogers for career hit 3,000 and gets a hug at first base from former teammate Tony Pérez. The Montreal Expos beat the Cincinnati Reds 4–3.
May 12 – At Royals Stadium, a potential game-ending routine fly ball becomes an Amos Otis walk-off inside-the-park home run as Reggie Jackson and Mickey Rivers collide in the outfield. The Kansas City Royals defeat the New York Yankees, 4–3. The misplay turns a sure Goose Gossage save into a sour loss for the current World Champion Yankees.
May 14 – With the Chicago Cubs losing 7–5 to the Los Angeles Dodgers, Dave Kingman hits a two-run home run with two outs in the ninth inning to send the game into extra innings. Kingman, who had also homered in the sixth, hits his third home run of the day in the fifteenth inning to give the Cubs a 10–7 victory over the Dodgers at Dodger Stadium, and end his day with eight RBIs. Following the game, Paul Olden, a reporter for radio station KLAC in Los Angeles asks Dodgers manager Tommy Lasorda, "What's your opinion of Kingman's performance?" during his post-game interview. Lasorda goes off in a now-famous obscenity-laced tirade.
May 16 - With the team in last place and having its worst start since 1968 Chicago White Sox owner Bill Veeck traded Bobby Bonds to the Texas Rangers for Claudell Washington, Rusty Torres and a minor league player named to be later.
May 20 – At Olympic Stadium, Willie Stargell of the Pittsburgh Pirates hits two home runs off Wayne Twitchell in a 6–0 victory over the Montreal Expos. His second is a 535-foot shot in the fourth inning that lands in the upper deck – the only fair ball ever to be hit there.
May 23 – With the Oakland Athletics leading the American League Western Division (24–15), manager Bobby Winkles walks off the job. Jack McKeon takes over.
May 30 - In his Major League debut Silvio Martinez pitched a complete game one-hitter as the St. Louis Cardinals beat the hapless New York Mets 8-2. The only Hit Silvio gave up was a 2-run home run by Met Steve Henderson.

June
June 3 – Davey Johnson becomes the first major leaguer to hit two pinch-hit grand slams in a season, as the Philadelphia Phillies beat the Los Angeles Dodgers, 5–1.
June 14 – Pete Rose starts his 44-game hitting streak by collecting two hits in the Cincinnati Reds' 3–1 win over the Chicago Cubs.
June 16 – 
In his 12th major league season speckled with near-misses, Cincinnati's Tom Seaver finally hurls a no-hitter. The Cardinals are the 4–0 victims as Seaver strikes out 3 batters.
Fresh off the Arizona State University campus with no minor league ball, the Atlanta Braves' Bob Horner homers in his first major league game off Bert Blyleven of the Pittsburgh Pirates.
June 17 – The Yankees' Ron Guidry strikes out 18 batters – 15 in 6 innings – in a 4–0 shutout of the California Angels, setting an American League record for left-handers. The victory raises the New York Yankee southpaw's record to 11–0.
June 26 - In only their second season, the Toronto Blue Jays we're world beaters - for one day - as they scored 24 runs against an established Baltimore Orioles with the football like final score of 24-10 before only 16,184 at Tornto's Exhibition Stadium.
June 27 - Joe Rudi hit a pinch-hit grand slam homer in the seventh to help his California Angels knock Kansas City out of a tie for first place with the Texas Rangers with a 5-4 Angels win over the Royals.
June 29 - Don Sutton set a Los Angeles career strikeout record while pitching for the Dodgers. He struck out Gary Matthews in the first inning for his 2,284th career strikeout, passing a Dodgers record previously held by Don Drysdale in the Dodgers' 7-3 win over the Braves.
June 30 – In the first game of a 10–9, 10–5 doubleheader loss to the Atlanta Braves, the San Francisco Giants' Willie McCovey hits his 500th career home run, off Braves pitcher Jamie Easterly. McCovey becomes the 12th member of the 500th home run club. Giant Mike Ivie adds his 2nd pinch grand slam of the year in the opener. Giant Jack Clark has 3 runs in the 2 games.

July
July 11 – At San Diego, the National League wins the All-Star Game over the American League, 7–3. Dodgers first baseman Steve Garvey earns the MVP trophy. Vida Blue starts for the NL, becoming the first pitcher to start for both leagues in the All-Star Game. Blue also started in 1971 and 1975 for the American League.
July 13 – Jerry Koosman and Tom Seaver lock up for the second time since Seaver's trade to the Cincinnati Reds. Koosman and the Mets beat Seaver and the Reds, 4–2. Only one of the three runs Seaver gives up is earned.
July 17 – The Kansas City Royals defeated the New York Yankees 9–7 in 11 innings, but the game is remembered for Reggie Jackson ignoring signs from third-base coach Dick Howser with the score tied 5–5 in the bottom of the 10th. With Thurman Munson on first, manager Billy Martin wanted Jackson to sacrifice bunt. Jackson made a half-hearted attempt with the first pitch, and Martin removed the bunt sign. Jackson, however, defied Martin and still attempted a bunt, but ended up popping out to the catcher. Jackson was suspended by Martin for five games.
July 21:
As Reggie Jackson was returning from suspension, Billy Martin says in a post-game interview about Jackson and Yankee owner George Steinbrenner, "One's a born liar (referring to Jackson), and the other's convicted (referring to Steinbrenner, about an incident from the past when Steinbrenner was accused of making illegal presidential campaign contributions)." Martin later appears on live television tearfully announcing his resignation from the Yankees, although some sources believed Steinbrenner actually fired him. Bob Lemon is named Yankee manager for the remainder of the season.
Cleveland Indians starter Mike Paxton strikes out four batters in the fifth inning of an 11–0 win over the Seattle Mariners.
July 26 – Johnny Bench hits his 300th career home run.

August
August 1 – The Atlanta Braves trounce the Cincinnati Reds, 16–4, and stop Pete Rose's hitting streak at 44 games. Larry McWilliams and Gene Garber are the Atlanta pitchers. Rose goes 0-for-4, including striking out in the 9th inning to end the game. Rose's streak is the second-longest in major league history. He goes 70-for-182 during the skein (a batting average of .385).
August 5 – At Old-timers Day at Yankee Stadium, recently fired Billy Martin is announced as the New York Yankees' manager for the 1980 season.
August 6 - It's a record no one wants for any batter, in the 9th inning of an important key game, future Baseball Hall of Famer Willie Stargell struck out for the 1,711th time, breaking a Major League record for batters getting struck out that was previously held by Mickey Mantle. It turned out that strikeout came in the ninth inning of a 3-2 loss to the Philadelphia Phillies.
August 10 - Ron Guidry fired a three-hitter to become the American League's first 16-game winner this year and Chris Chambliss knocked in four runs with a single and a double, leading The Yankees to a 5th straight win, a 9-0 triumph over the Milwaukee Brewers.
August 17 - This was the second of 6 straight seasons in which the New York Mets would finish either 5th or 6th place. In this game, the Mets lost to the San Diego Padres (with rookie Ozzie Smith on the team) 9-2 that would put the Mets in last place to stay for the entire season.
August 20 – Before the Los Angeles Dodgers' game against the New York Mets, Steve Garvey and Don Sutton engage in a clubhouse fistfight over comments made by Sutton in an interview with The Washington Post about Garvey being the "All-American boy".
August 31 - Joe Morgan, George Foster and Johnny Bench hit home runs to help the Cincinnati Reds snap a six-game losing streak via 12-6 win over the St. Louis Cardinals. Tom Seaver pitched seven innings for the win and reliever Tom Hume gave a 9th inning grand slam by Wayne Garrett.

September
September 5 – The Montreal Expos beat the Chicago Cubs 10–8 in a 9-inning game that sees a Major-League record 45 players participate.
September 7 – The "Boston Massacre" begins. The Boston Red Sox enter today's opening game of a four-game series in Boston with a four-game lead over the New York Yankees; a lead which had been fourteen games just weeks earlier. The Yankees defeat the Red Sox 15–3, and go on to sweep the series, erasing the Red Sox lead in the American League East Division.
September 14 – 39-year-old Atlanta Braves pitcher Jim Bouton earns his 62nd and final big league victory (his first since 1970), a 4–1 win over the San Francisco Giants. Bouton is best known as the author of the baseball diary Ball Four.
September 20 – The Yankees' Ron Guidry suffers his third and final loss in a stellar 25–3, Cy Young Award-winning season. The Yankees are defeated by the Toronto Blue Jays with left-hander Mike Willis the winning pitcher. All three of Guidry's losses in 1978 were to left-handers named "Mike": Mike Caldwell, Mike Flanagan, and Willis.
September 23 – Following a dinner party in Gary, Indiana, California Angels outfielder Lyman Bostock was killed while riding in a car with several others.  The estranged husband of a woman in the car fired a single shotgun blast into the car, killing Bostock. Bostock was 27 years old.
September 30 – The Philadelphia Phillies overcame a first-inning grand slam by Willie Stargell to beat the host Pittsburgh Pirates, their in-state rivals, 10–8, to clinch their third straight National League East Title. Winning pitcher Randy Lerch contributes two home runs to his cause. The loss snaps the Pirates' streak of 24 straight wins at Three Rivers Stadium.

October–December
October 1
Gaylord Perry of the San Diego Padres records his 3000th career strikeout.
Led by home runs from Rick Burleson and Jim Rice, and Luis Tiant's two-hit pitching, the Boston Red Sox shut out the Toronto Blue Jays 5–0 at Fenway Park, closing out the regular season with an eight-game winning streak. They will have to play a one-game playoff at Fenway the very next day against the New York Yankees, whom they had led by as many as 14 games in July, as the Cleveland Indians and Rick Waits defeat the Yankees 9–2 at Yankee Stadium. News of the Indians' victory is announced on Fenway Park's video screen with the words "THANK YOU, RICK WAITS – GAME TOMORROW."
October 2 – Bucky Dent's crucial 7th-inning home run helps the New York Yankees beat the Boston Red Sox, 5–4, in a one-game playoff for the American League East title. It is another defining moment in the Yankees – Red Sox rivalry. With Kansas City, Los Angeles and Philadelphia also having won their divisions, all four defending division winners repeat. Ron Guidry closes out the year with a 25–3 record, but not before giving up a home run to Carl Yastrzemski—the only one he will allow to a left-handed hitter all season.

October 4 – Steve Garvey smashes two home runs and a triple to pace the Los Angeles Dodgers to a 9–5 win over the Philadelphia Phillies in the opener of the National League Championship Series. Davey Lopes and Steve Yeager also homer at Veterans Stadium.
October 7 – The Los Angeles Dodgers win the National League Championship Series, 3 games to 1, with a 4–3 victory over the Philadelphia Phillies. Bill Russell's 10th-inning, two-out single scores Ron Cey with the winning run. A walk to Cey and a routine liner that Garry Maddox muffs in center field sets up Russell's game-winner. Dusty Baker collects four hits for the Dodgers.
October 17 – The New York Yankees win their fourth straight game, 7–2, to clinch their second consecutive World Series over the Los Angeles Dodgers. Yankees shortstop Bucky Dent is named Series MVP.
November 10 – In a 10-player transaction, the New York Yankees send former Cy Young Award winner Sparky Lyle along with Mike Heath, Larry McCall, Dave Rajsich, Domingo Ramos and cash consideration to the Texas Rangers, in exchange for Juan Beníquez, Mike Griffin, Paul Mirabella, Dave Righetti and Minor leaguer Greg Jemison.
November 16 - Pittsburgh Pirates outfielder Dave Parker who had a Gold Glove award now wins the National League MVP, he got 21 of 24 first place votes.
November 22 – Detroit Tigers second baseman Lou Whitaker wins the American League Rookie of the Year Award with 21 of 28 first places votes over Paul Molitor of the Milwaukee Brewers.
November 28 – The Cincinnati Reds dismiss their nine-year manager, Sparky Anderson, who had led the team to five NL Division titles, four NL Championship pennants, two World Championships (1975–76), and averaged 96 wins per season.
December 8 – The New York Mets trade pitcher Jerry Koosman to the Minnesota Twins for minor league pitcher Greg Field and a player to be named later. The trade leaves Ed Kranepool as the last remaining member of the ″Miracle Mets″ team that won the 1969 World Series. The Twins will complete the trade by sending Jesse Orosco to the Mets on February 7, .

Movies
A Love Affair: The Eleanor and Lou Gehrig Story (TV)
The Bad News Bears Go to Japan
One in a Million: The Ron LeFlore Story (TV)

Births

January
January 3 – Delvin James
January 4 – Chris Gissell
January 4 – Willie Martínez
January 6 – Casey Fossum
January 7 – Kevin Mench
January 11 – Greg Aquino
January 12 – Luis Ayala
January 16 – Alfredo Amézaga
January 17 – Mark Malaska
January 18 – Brian Falkenborg
January 19 – Wilton Veras
January 20 – Chris Mears
January 20 – John Rodriguez
January 22 – Chone Figgins
January 25 – Derrick Turnbow
January 26 – Esteban Germán
January 26 – Steve Green
January 26 – Andrés Torres
January 27 – Ángel Berroa
January 27 – Pete Laforest
January 28 – Tomás de la Rosa
January 30 – John Patterson

February
February 1 – Erick Almonte
February 1 – Dusty Bergman
February 5 – Devern Hansack
February 6 – Steve Andrade
February 6 – Adam Shabala
February 7 – Endy Chávez
February 10 – Cedrick Bowers
February 10 – Rubén Mateo
February 11 – Brent Butler
February 12 – Tim Redding
February 13 – Scott Dohmann
February 21 – René Reyes
February 23 – Luke Prokopec
February 24 – Steve Torrealba
February 24 – DeWayne Wise
February 28 – Brian Reith

March
March 1 – Ken Harvey
March 1 – Kris Keller
March 2 – Jared Sandberg
March 3 – Matt Diaz
March 4 – Rodrigo Rosario
March 5 – Mike Hessman
March 9 – Mike Neu
March 11 – Kevin Reese
March 14 – Matt Kata
March 18 – Kasey Olemberger
March 20 – Mike Bynum
March 21 – Jeff Bajenaru
March 21 – Cristian Guzmán
March 22 – Jeremy Griffiths
March 24 – José Valverde
March 27 – Dee Brown
March 29 – Eric Bruntlett
March 30 – Josh Bard

April
April 2 – John Gall
April 3 – Bobby Hill
April 4 – Jason Ellison
April 5 – Brandon Backe
April 6 – Blaine Neal
April 11 – Josh Hancock
April 15 – Milton Bradley
April 15 – Tim Corcoran
April 21 – Jack Taschner
April 26 – Joe Crede
April 27 – Runelvys Hernández
April 29 – Tony Armas Jr.

May
May 9 – Aaron Harang
May 12 – Josh Phelps
May 13 – Ryan Bukvich
May 13 – Barry Zito
May 15 – Clayton Andrews
May 15 – Guillermo Rodríguez
May 16 – Nick Bierbrodt
May 17 – John Foster
May 17 – Carlos Peña
May 18 – Marcus Giles
May 20 – Wilson Valdez
May 21 – Ricardo Rodríguez
May 23 – Scott Dunn
May 23 – Mike González
May 23 – Chris Sampson
May 24 – Dave Pember
May 24 – Brad Penny
May 25 – Travis Hughes
May 25 – Mike Vento
May 30 – Rico Washington

June
June 3 – Steve Smyth
June 5 – Travis Chapman
June 6 – Jaime Bubela
June 7 – Donaldo Méndez
June 10 – Carlos Rivera
June 14 – Edgar Gonzalez
June 15 – Zach Day
June 17 – Dernell Stenson
June 19 – Claudio Vargas
June 20 – Kevin Gregg
June 20 – Bobby Seay
June 21 – Luis Rivera
June 22 – Anthony Ferrari
June 22 – Willie Harris
June 25 – Aramis Ramírez
June 25 – Luke Scott
June 27 – Oscar Salazar
June 29 – Trey Hodges
June 29 – Joe Inglett

July

July 2 – Greg Dobbs
July 3 – Juan Rivera
July 10 – Sam Marsonek
July 13 – Ryan Ludwick
July 14 – Mike Burns
July 15 – Miguel Olivo
July 16 – Jorge Vásquez
July 17 – Jason Jennings
July 18 – Ben Sheets
July 19 – Yorvit Torrealba
July 19 – Steve Watkins
July 21 – Willie Eyre
July 29 – Mike Adams

August
August 1 – Tim Olson
August 2 – Matt Guerrier
August 4 – Luke Allen
August 4 – Jon Knott
August 5 – Jamal Strong
August 8 – Alexis Gómez
August 8 – Brian Sanches
August 10 – Jorge Campillo
August 11 – Eric Crozier
August 12 – Michel Hernández
August 15 – Santiago Ramírez
August 16 – Brian Gordon
August 17 – Chad Qualls
August 18 – Kevin Barry
August 18 – Matt Hensley
August 19 – Eude Brito
August 19 – Chris Capuano
August 20 – Chris Schroder
August 20 – T. J. Tucker
August 21 – Lee Gronkiewicz
August 21 – Jason Marquis
August 29 – Ed Rogers
August 30 – Cliff Lee
August 30 – Todd Wellemeyer
August 31 – Tim Drew

September
September 1 – Stephen Smitherman
September 3 – Juan Pérez
September 4 – Nick Regilio
September 5 – Matt Watson
September 6 – Frank Brooks
September 6 – Alex Escobar
September 8 – Gil Meche
September 9 – Kurt Ainsworth
September 10 – Nick Green
September 11 – Junior Herndon
September 14 – Carlos Torres
September 18 – Wilkin Ruan
September 19 – Nick Johnson
September 20 – Jason Bay
September 25 – Joel Piñeiro
September 27 – Jon Rauch
September 28 – Joey Nation

October
October 3 – Steve Kent
October 4 – Kyle Lohse
October 8 – Keith Reed
October 10 – Dan Bellino
October 14 – Ryan Church
October 15 – Juan Cruz
October 15 – Josh Rabe
October 23 – John Lackey
October 24 – Chris Bootcheck
October 25 – J. J. Davis
October 26 – Jaime Cerda
October 30 – Luis Matos

November
November 2 – Carmen Cali
November 3 – Anastacio Martínez
November 4 – John Grabow
November 5 – Corey Thurman
November 7 – Juan Salas
November 9 – Todd Self
November 9 – Jason Standridge
November 10 – Jorge DePaula
November 12 – Aaron Heilman
November 14 – Xavier Nady
November 17 – Darnell McDonald
November 17 – Valentino Pascucci
November 18 – Tim Hummel
November 19 – Jeff Bailey
November 20 – Bill White
November 25 – Joe Borchard
November 25 – Zach McClellan
November 27 – Jimmy Rollins

December
December 2 – Peter Moylan
December 3 – Matt Childers
December 5 – Josh Stewart
December 6 – Chris Başak
December 6 – Jason Bulger
December 8 – Vernon Wells
December 9 – Jeff Duncan
December 11 – Jason Szuminski
December 14 – Dave Gassner
December 15 – Michael Wuertz
December 17 – Alex Cintrón
December 17 – Chase Utley
December 19 – Andy Cannizaro
December 19 – Vinnie Chulk
December 19 – Marshall McDougall
December 19 – Mark Woodyard
December 21 – Dicky Gonzalez
December 22 – Chris Jakubauskas
December 23 – Víctor Martínez
December 26 – Charles Thomas

Deaths

January
January 2 – Óscar Estrada, 75, Cuban southpaw pitcher and outfielder who played in both the Eastern Colored League (33 games for the 1924 Cuban Stars East) and segregated Organized Baseball (including one game for the 1929 St. Louis Browns)
January 4 – Joe Dawson, 80, pitcher for 1924 Cleveland Indians and 1927–1929 Pittsburgh Pirates, getting into 59 career games; member of 1927 National League champions who hurled a scoreless inning against the "Murderers' Row" 1927 Yankees in Game 2 of Fall Classic
January 5 – Snipe Conley, 85, pitcher who worked in 60 games for the 1914–1915 Baltimore Terrapins of the "outlaw" Federal League, then appeared in five games for the 1918 Cincinnati Reds
January 7 – George H. Burns, 84, first baseman for five American League teams who batted .307 in 1,866 career games over 16 seasons; led AL in hits twice (1918 and 1926) and won the league's MVP award in the latter year; member of two World Series champions, the 1920 Cleveland Indians and 1929 Philadelphia Athletics
January 13 – Bill Clowers, 79, pitcher for the Boston Red Sox in the 1920s
January 13 – Merwin Jacobson, 83, backup outfielder for the New York Giants, Chicago Cubs and Brooklyn Robins between 1915 and 1927
January 13 – Joe McCarthy, 90, Hall of Fame manager who led the New York Yankees to eight pennants and record seven World Series titles; also won 1929 NL pennant with Chicago Cubs, and was first manager to capture titles in both leagues; posted a 1,460–867 (.627) mark with the Yankees alone, from 1931 through May 23, 1946, when he resigned; also managed Boston Red Sox from 1948 to June 18, 1950; as of 2021, his 2,125 career wins ranked eighth in major league history, and his winning percentages of .615 (regular season) and .698 (postseason) were both all-time records
January 19 – Milt Shoffner, 72, left-handed hurler for 1929–1931 Cleveland Indians, 1937–1939 Boston Bees and 1939–1940 Cincinnati Reds, working in 134 career major league games
January 23 – Thurman Jennings, 87, outfielder and second baseman for the 1920–1921 Chicago Giants of the Negro National League
January 27 – Sarge Connally, 79, pitcher who appeared in 304 games in 12 seasons spanning 1921 to 1934 for the Chicago White Sox and Cleveland Indians
January 27 – Monte Pearson, 69, All-Star pitcher who won 100 games, mainly with the 1932–1935 Indians and 1936–1940 New York Yankees; four time World Series champion as a member of Bronx Bombers
January 28 – Larry Raines, 47, middle infielder and third baseman for the Cleveland Indians from 1957 to 1958, who is recognized for having been the first ballplayer to perform professionally in Minor League Baseball, Negro league baseball, Japanese Baseball and the major leagues
January 29 – Sam Thompson, 69, pitcher who appeared in the Negro leagues between 1932 and 1942, primarily for the Philadelphia Stars of the Negro National League

February
February 1 – Jack Saltzgaver, 75, infielder for New York Yankees (1932 and 1934–1937) who, after almost eight full years in the minors, returned to MLB at 42 in 1945 for a final stint for the wartime Pittsburgh Pirates
February 2 – Archie Wise, 65, appeared in three games as a pitcher and pinch hitter for 1932 Chicago White Sox
February 3 – Pete Compton, 88, outfielder who appeared in 291 games for five clubs, notably the St. Louis Browns, between 1911 and 1918
February 3 – Ray Flaskamper, 76, Chicago White Sox shortstop who played in 26 games in 1927
February 3 – Mike Herrera, 80, second baseman for the Boston Red Sox from 1925 to 1926, and one of the first men to play in American, National, and Negro leagues
February 4 – Dave Keefe, 81, pitcher in 97 games for Philadelphia Athletics and Cleveland Indians between 1917 and 1922, later a longtime coach and traveling secretary for the Athletics
February 6 – Babe Ganzel, 76, outfielder who appeared in 23 games for 1927–1928 Washington Senators; son of 19th century MLB catcher
February 6 – Roy Grover, 86, second baseman for Philadelphia Athletics (1916–1917, 1919) and Washington Senators (1919); played in 207 big-league games
February 8 – Josephine Kabick, 55, female pitcher who played from 1944 through 1947 in the All-American Girls Professional Baseball League
February 15 – Claude Hayslett, 65, second baseman and pitcher in the Negro leagues between 1937 and 1941
February 18 – Luke Hamlin, 73, pitcher who worked in 261 games over nine seasons between 1933 and 1944 for four MLB clubs, notably the Brooklyn Dodgers, for whom he went 20–13 in 1939
February 19 – Phil Paine, 47, who compiled a 10–1 won–lost mark in 95 games pitched for the Boston/Milwaukee Braves (1951, 1954–1957) and St. Louis Cardinals (1958); said to be the first American to play in Nippon Professional Baseball when he hurled for the 1953 Nishitetsu Lions during his posting to Japan as a U.S. serviceman
February 21 – Slicker Parks, 82, pitcher who worked in ten contests for the 1921 Detroit Tigers
February 23 – Vic Harris, 72, outfielder and manager in the Negro leagues who guided the Homestead Grays to seven Negro National League pennants, including five in a row from 1937 to 1941; played in six East-West All-Star games between 1933 and 1947
February 27 – Gerard "Nig" Lipscomb, 67, second baseman and pitcher who appeared in 36 games for 1937 St. Louis Browns

March
March 3 – Ted Strong, 61, multiyear All-Star at both right field and shortstop who played in the Negro American League between 1937 and 1948, principally for the Kansas City Monarchs; member of Monarchs' 1942 Negro World Series champions; also a member of basketball's Harlem Globetrotters
March 7 – Steve Bilko, 49, portly first baseman who appeared in 600 MLB games for the St. Louis Cardinals (1949–1954), Chicago Cubs (1954), Cincinnati Redlegs (1958), Los Angeles Dodgers (1958), Detroit Tigers (1960) and Los Angeles Angels (1961–1962); legendary minor-league slugger who led Pacific Coast League in home runs for three straight years (1955–1957), belting 55 and 56 homers in the latter two seasons and winning the 1956 PCL Triple Crown; three-time PCL MVP and member of its Hall of Fame
March 8 – Wade Johnston, 79, outfielder who played for five Negro leagues clubs between 1922 and 1933, notably the Kansas City Monarchs and Detroit Stars; led 1930 Negro National League with ten triples in 69 games played
March 12 – Ferrell Anderson, 60, backup catcher who played in 97 career games for the 1946 Brooklyn Dodgers and 1953 St. Louis Cardinals
March 12 – Alex McCarthy, 88, infielder for the Pittsburgh Pirates and Chicago Cubs from 1910 to 1917, getting into 432 career contests
March 12 – Gene Moore, 68, right fielder known for his accurate arm who played 1,042 games for six MLB clubs between 1931 and 1945; 1937 National League All-Star and member of 1944 St. Louis Browns, only team from that city to win an American League pennant
March 14 – Kent Greenfield, 75, pitcher who appeared in 152 games between 1924 and 1929 for the New York Giants, Boston Braves and Brooklyn Robins 
March 16 – Moe Franklin, 63, infielder who got into 61 career games for 1941–1942 Detroit Tigers
March 21 – Fritz Coumbe, 88, a pitcher for the Boston Red Sox, Cleveland Naps and Indians and the Cincinnati Reds between 1914 and 1921
March 27 – Dutch Zwilling, 89, outfielder in 366 games for three Chicago MLB teams during the 1910s: the 1910 White Sox, 1914–1915 Whales (of the then-"outlaw" Federal League), and 1916 Cubs; led Fed circuit in home runs with 16 in 1914 and runs batted in with 94 the following season; longtime minor-league manager and big-league scout
March 30 – Billy Cox, 58, third baseman, mainly with the Brooklyn Dodgers (1948–1954), well known for his spectacular defense

April
April 2 – Bill Brubaker, 67, third baseman for the Pittsburgh Pirates for all or parts of 1932 through 1940, then briefly for Boston Braves in 1943; drove in 102 runs in 1936, but led NL hitters in strikeouts
April 3 – Ray French, 83, shortstop/second baseman in 82 games for the 1920 New York Yankees, 1923 Brooklyn Robins and 1924 Chicago White Sox
April 8 – Ford Frick, 83, Hall of Fame executive who served as Commissioner of Baseball (1951–1965) and president of the National League (1935–1951); ex-sportswriter and "ghostwriter" for Babe Ruth who ruled in 1961 that home run records of Ruth and Roger Maris would be recorded separately based on season length
April 8 – Dick Risenhoover, 51, sportscaster; member of the Texas Rangers' broadcast team since 1972 and lead announcer from 1974 until his death
April 14 – Joe Gordon, 63, Baseball Hall of Famer and nine-time All-Star second baseman in 11 seasons for the New York Yankees and Cleveland Indians, who won the 1942 MVP award and set an American League record of 246 home runs at his position; later a manager (Indians, Detroit Tigers, Kansas City Athletics and Kansas City Royals between 1958 and 1969)
April 20 – Jack Graney, 91, Canadian left fielder who played his entire career with the Cleveland Naps and Indians, best known the first batter to face Babe Ruth in a major-league game (July 11, 1914); in 1932 became the Indians' play-by-play broadcaster, first former player to transition to radio booth, holding the job through 1953
April 28 – Art Doll, 64, batteryman who played seven MLB games for Boston of the National League in 1935, 1936 and 1938—four as a pitcher and three as a catcher
May 29 – Carl Reynolds, 75, outfielder for five teams who batted .302 lifetime

May
May 1 – Claude Corbitt, 62, infield utility who played for the Brooklyn Dodgers and Cincinnati Reds in a span of four seasons from 1945 to 1949
May 8 – Red Smith, 73, two-sport star at Notre Dame, then a player and coach in both professional baseball and professional football; debuted as a catcher for the New York Giants of the National League in 1927 and later played with the Green Bay Packers of the National Football League; later an assistant coach with the Packers and New York football Giants, a minor league manager, and a coach for Chicago Cubs, 1945–1949 
May 15 – Herman Dunlap, 70, outfielder for the Chicago American Giants of the Negro American League in 1937 and 1938
May 16 – Mike Wilson, 81, catcher for the  1921 Pittsburgh Pirates
May 20 – Bob Logan, 68, pitcher who played for the Brooklyn Dodgers, Detroit Tigers, Chicago Cubs, Cincinnati Reds and Boston Braves in all or part of five seasons between 1935 and 1945
May 22 – Pete Susko, 73, first baseman for the Washington Senators in its 1934 season 
May 26 – Harris McGalliard, 71, Japanese Baseball League catcher who played for Nagoya and the Korakuen Eagles from 1936 to 1938
May 29 – Carl Reynolds, 75, fine outfielder and consistent hitter who played from 1927 through 1939 for the Chicago White Sox, Washington Senators, St. Louis Browns, Boston Red Sox and Chicago Cubs, ending his career with a.302 batting average, including 1,357 hits, 80 home runs and 699 runs batted in 1,222 games

June
June 2 – Bob McGraw, 83, pitcher for the New York Yankees, Boston Red Sox, Brooklyn Robins, St. Louis Cardinals and Philadelphia Phillies in a span of nine seasons from 1917 to 1929
June 3 – Marv Rickert, 57, backup outfielder who played with five different clubs in five seasons, including the 1948 Boston Braves who won the National League pennant
June 16 – Hugh Shelley, 67, outfielder who played for the Detroit Tigers in 1935, though he was not on their World Series roster that season
June 20 – Bill Dietrich, 68, nicknamed "Bullfrog", pitcher who played from 1933 through 1948 for the Philadelphia Athletics, Washington Senators and Chicago White Sox, whose no-hitter over the St. Louis Browns on June 1, 1937, boosted the White Sox' chances during their futile pursuit of the American League pennant
June 20 – Stack Martin, 79, who played every position (although mainly a first baseman) for the Indianapolis ABCs and Detroit Stars of the Negro National League from 1925 to 1928
June 21 – Tom Fiall, 84, outfielder for Brooklyn, Baltimore and New York of the Eastern Colored League in 1923 and 1925
June 28 – Johnny Schulte, 81, backup catcher for five teams in all of his five years in the Major Leagues between 1923 and 1932; member of the 1929 National League pennant-winning Chicago Cubs; later a coach during 15 full seasons for the New York Yankees from 1934 to 1948, winning seven World Series rings; trusted advisor of Hall of Fame manager Joe McCarthy
June 30 – Danny Lynch, 52, second baseman for the 1948 Chicago Cubs

July
July 1 – Joe Vance, 72, pitcher for the Chicago White Sox and New York Yankees in parts of three seasons between 1935 and 1938
July 12 – Herb Souell, 65, All-Star third baseman for the 1940–1948 Kansas City Monarchs; led Negro American League in stolen bases (twice, in 1946–1947), runs batted in (1945), triples (1946), and hits (1947); member of 1942 Negro World Series champs
July 15 – Deacon Meyers, 78, pitcher/first baseman for the St. Louis Giants/Stars and Dayton Marcos of the Negro National League between 1921 and 1926
July 24 – Joel Hunt, 72, Hall of Fame football player and coach, who also played 16 games in the majors as an outfielder and pinch hitter for the 1931–1932 St. Louis Cardinals
July 29 – Charlie Bold, 83, Swedish first baseman who played for the St. Louis Browns in its 1914 season

August
August 2 – Ewing Russell, 72, third baseman for the 1924 and 1926 Harrisburg Giants (Eastern Colored League) and 1926 Dayton Marcos (Negro National League)
August 5 – Jesse Haines, 85, Hall of Fame pitcher who won 210 games, including a no-hitter, for the St. Louis Cardinals, while compiling three 20-win seasons, and two wins in the 1926 World Series
August 7 – Kay Lionikas, 54, outfielder, one of three descendants of Greek migrants to play in the All-American Girls Professional Baseball League
August 14 – Maury Newlin, 64, pitcher who played with the St. Louis Browns in the 1940 and 1941 seasons
August 15 – Ed Chaplin, 84, catcher for the Boston Red Sox between 1920 and 1922
August 18 – George Harper, 86, outfielder for six teams in five seasons between 1943 and 1950, who hit .300 or higher in three of these seasons
August 23 – Hal Weafer, 78, American League umpire from 1943 to 1947; former minor league first baseman and manager
August 30 – Ed Sicking, 81, middle infielder and third baseman who played for the Chicago Cubs, New York Giants, Philadelphia Phillies, Cincinnati Reds and Pittsburgh Pirates over part of five seasons from 1916 to 1927

September
September 11 – Mike Gazella, 82, utility infielder for the New York Yankees in four seasons between 1923 and 1928, being a member of three World Series champion teams and one AL pennant winner
September 11 – Snipe Hansen, 71, pitcher for the Philadelphia Phillies and St. Louis Browns in a span of five seasons from 1930 to 1935
September 15 – Larry Bettencourt, 72, outfielder and third baseman who played for the St. Louis Browns in three seasons from 1928 to 1932, and later served as a center for the NFL Green Bay Packers in 1933
September 16 – Bill Foster, 74, star pitcher in the Negro leagues where he was a dominant left-hander, and later a head coach at Alcorn State University for two decades
September 18 – Joe Lillard, 73, NFL halfback (1932–1933) and outfielder/pitcher for the Chicago American Giants and Cincinnati Tigers of the Negro leagues between 1932 and 1937
September 24 – Lyman Bostock, 27, fine defensive outfielder and base runner for California Angels who hit .323 and .336 during his first two full big league seasons with the 1976–1977 Minnesota Twins; his life and career were cut short when he was the victim of a meaningless, accidental homicide; son of Negro leagues star Lyman Sr.
September 25 – Pepper Daniels, 76, catcher for four Negro leagues clubs between 1921 and 1935, primarily the Detroit Stars

October
October 1 – Abe White, 74, pitcher for the St. Louis Cardinals in 1937
October 1 – Ed Steele, 63, outfielder for the 1942–1948 Birmingham Black Barons who batted .359 lifetime and led the Negro American League in hitting (.391) in 1945
October 8 – Jim Gilliam, 49, two-time All-Star second baseman for the Brooklyn/Los Angeles Dodgers from 1953 to 1966, player-coach in 1965–1966, and full-time Dodgers' coach from 1967 until his death; won four World Series rings, as well as Rookie of the Year Award honors both in the Negro leagues and the National League; after his passing, his jersey #19 was retired by the Dodgers
October 13 – George Jeffcoat, 64, pitcher in 70 career games for the Brooklyn Dodgers and Boston Braves in four seasons between 1936 and 1943; brother of Hal Jeffcoat; after baseball, became an ordained Baptist minister
October 16 – Eddie Stumpf, 84, minor league player, manager, coach, scout and executive in a career that spanned more than four decades
October 25 – Molly Craft, 82, pitcher who played from 1916 through 1919 for the Washington Senators
October 27 – Rube Walberg, 82, pitcher who won 155 games between 1923 and 1937, primarily with the Philadelphia Athletics; member of 1929–1930 world champions
October 30 – Reese Diggs, 63,  pitcher who appeared in four games for the Washington Senators in the 1934 season

November
November 5 – Tommy O'Brien, 59, backup outfielder for the Pittsburgh Pirates, Boston Red Sox and Washington Senators in a span of five seasons from 1943 to 1950
November 8 – Steve Gerkin, 75, 32-year-old rookie pitcher who played for the Philadelphia Athletics in its 1945 season, one of many ballplayers who only appeared in the major leagues during World War II
November 11 – Bennie Borgmann, 80, minor-league infielder and manager and NBA basketball player who served the St. Louis Cardinals as a longtime scout; member of Basketball Hall of Fame
November 12 – Buzz Boyle, 70, outfielder for the Boston Braves and Brooklyn Dodgers during five seasons spanning 1929–1935; led National League outfielders in assists in 1934 and also had a 25-game hitting streak that year; later a minor league manager and served as pilot of the 1946 Muskegon Lassies of the All-American Girls Professional Baseball League; longtime scout for Cincinnati Reds and Montreal Expos
November 12 – Roy Elsh, 87, backup outfielder for the Chicago White Sox over part of two seasons from 1923 to 1925
November 12 – George Shears, 88, pitcher for the 1912 New York Highlanders
November 13 – Les Powers, 69, first baseman who played with the New York Giants in 1938 and for the Philadelphia Phillies in 1939
November 16 – France Laux, 80, St. Louis sportscaster who gained fame as voice of the 1930s Cardinals, calling their games (and those of the American League's Browns) from 1930 through 1942; focused on Cardinals in 1943 and then switched to Browns in 1948, continuing with them part-time until 1953, their last season in Missouri before they became the Baltimore Orioles; worked six World Series and eight All-Star games
November 16 – Harry Matuzak, 68, pitcher who played for the Philadelphia Athletics in the 1936 and 1938 seasons 
November 20 – Warren Brown, 84, Chicago sportswriter, who earned J. G. Taylor Spink Award honors in 1973, and was inducted in the National Baseball Hall of Fame the same year along with outfielder Mickey Mantle, pitcher Whitey Ford and umpire Jocko Conlan
November 23 – Buck Ross, 63, pitcher who played from 1936 through 1945 for the Philadelphia Athletics and Chicago White Sox
November 29 – Al Williamson, 78, pitcher for the 1928 Chicago White Sox

December
December 8 – Nick Cullop, 78, backup outfielder who played for the New York Yankees, Washington Senators, Cleveland Indians, Brooklyn Robins and Cincinnati Reds over part of five seasons spanning 1926–1931; fearsome slugger and longtime skipper in minor leagues
December 9 – Dick Siebert, 66, All-Star first baseman for the Philadelphia Athletics who twice batted .300, and later coached at the University of Minnesota for 31 years, while winning three College World Series titles
December 11 – Paul O'Dea, 78, two-way player (primarily an outfielder who appeared in four games as a southpaw hurler) who played in 163 contests for the Cleveland Indians from 1944 to 1945 and later scouted and managed in the Cleveland farm system
December 12 – Nick Dumovich, 76, pitcher for the 1923 Chicago Cubs
December 20 – Willard Mullin, 76, cartoonist whose caricature of the Brooklyn Bum personified the Dodgers franchise prior to its move to Los Angeles in 1958
December 21 – Joe Mathes, 87, second baseman who played for the Philadelphia Athletics, St. Louis Terriers and Boston Braves in a span of three seasons from 1912 to 1916; managed in the minor leagues off and on from 1919 through 1934, then became a scout and farm system director for the St. Louis Cardinals
December 21 – Gus Rooney, 86, Boston sportswriter believed to be the first play-by-play radio announcer for the Boston Red Sox on April 13, 1926; also broadcast games of the National League Braves that season
December 24 – George McQuinn, 68, seven-time All-Star first baseman for the St. Louis Browns and New York Yankees, who had 34-game hitting streak in 1938
December 24 – Bill Rodgers, 91, second baseman who played between 1915 and 1916 for the Cleveland Indians, Boston Red Sox and Cincinnati Reds
December 29 – Walt Alexander, 87, backup who played for the St. Louis Browns and New York Yankees in part of four seasons from 1912 to 1917
December 30 – Bobby Williams, 83, shortstop whose career was mostly spent with the Chicago American Giants of the Negro National League between 1920 and 1928; managed the 1934 Cleveland Red Sox to a 4–24 record
December 31 – Tod Davis, 54, infielder and pinch-hitter who played for the Philadelphia Athletics in the 1949 and 1951 seasons

References

External links

Major League Baseball official website 
Minor League Baseball official website
Baseball Almanac - Major League Baseball Players Who Died in 1978
Baseball Almanac - 1978 Major League Baseball season 
Baseball Reference - 1978 Major League Baseball summary